In Indian art, a surasundari (literally "celestial beauty") is a young maiden characterizing feminine beauty and graceful sensuality.

Buddhist and Jain shrines have featured sensual figures in form of yakshis and other spirits since 2nd century BCE. However, the surasundari motif gained prominence in Indian temple architecture only around the beginning of the 9th century CE. Shilpa-Prakasha, a 9th-century Tantric architectural treatise, declares a monument without a surasundari as inferior and fruitless. The 15th century text Kshirarnava states that the surasundaris should be depicted looking down (adho-drishti), not looking at someone.

In temple sculptures, the surasundaris are often depicted as attendants of gods and goddesses. They also manifest as dancing apsaras. A salabhanjika or tree nymph is another variation of a surasundari. Other forms of a surasundari include:

The presence of surasundaris in religious shrines is interpreted in several ways. A spiritual interpretation is that they represent shakti (the feminine cosmic energy), and can be considered as both auspicious and empowering. A secular interpretation is that they represent the prosperity of the king who commissioned the temple.

References 

 
Hindu temple architecture
Indian sculpture